The LEVC VN5 is a plug-in hybrid panel van produced since November 2020 by British electric vehicle manufacturer London EV Company (LEVC), a subsidiary of Chinese automobile company Geely.

Overview

The LEVC TX Hackney carriage was launched in 2017, as a plug-in hybrid range-extender electric vehicle. Geely announced its intentions to build electric commercial vehicles based on the LEVC TX. 

Spy shots of a new LEVC TX-based van first surfaced on the internet in February 2018. Over a year later on June 19, 2019, an unnamed LEVC plug-in commercial van was revealed, which was later officially named the VN5 next year in March 2020, with "VN" standing for "van" and "5" referring to the 5 cubic metres (176.5 cu ft.) of cargo space. 

The VN5 went on sale in the United Kingdom in November 2020 with a starting price of £46,500 ($64,335), and although eligible for the United Kingdom's plug-in hybrid van government grant of up to £8,000 ($11,068), it has a much higher overall cost than other compact electric vans available in the United Kingdom such as the Maxus e Deliver 3, Renault Kangoo ZE, and Nissan e-NV200. The VN5 has three available trim levels; Business, City, and Ultima. The LEVC VN5 went on sale for the rest of Europe in July 2021.

Specifications

Battery and engine

Cargo
For cargo access, on the side is a single sliding door and in the back are 60/40 split rear doors.

Features
The VN5 comes standard with a collision avoidance system, cruise control, and a  touchscreen, while a heated steering wheel, front and rear parking sensors, curtain airbags, and a lane departure warning system are available in the City and Ultima trim. Higher-quality seats and a backup camera are exclusive to the top-level Ultima trim.

LEVC e-Camper
The LEVC e-Camper is a camper van variant of the VN5. It was revealed in late June 2021 and will go on sale in Q4 2021 at a price of £62,250 ($86,458). It features an electric kitchenette, a rising roof, and a central folding table. The first row of the e-Camper has two seats that can swivel 180° and a second row bench seat which can slide back to form a dining/socializing room within the van.

References

External links
 LEVC VN5 official website
 LEVC e-Camper official website

Cars introduced in 2020
2020s cars
VN5
Retro-style automobiles